Paktika University (Is a government funded higher Educational institution in Paktika, Afghanistan. It is one of  universities in southern  Afghanistan. Paktika University  was established in 2012,the first chancellor of Paktika University was Mohammad Shifa Tassal.
 
Paktika University provides studies in Education, and Agriculture. It has more than 2000 students. The university enrolls around 500 students each year through an entrance exam directly under the control of the Afghan Ministry of Higher Education.

Overview

Paktiak University was established in 2012 based on the national developing policy of the government in the education sector in the framework of the Ministry of Higher Education. At first it had only one faculty of Education. After that faculty Agriculture was established in 2013.

ٍEducation Faculty
The Education faculty was the first in Paktika University. The Education faculty offers a four-year Education program. The Faculty has around 1500 students and  enrolls around 400 students each year.

The Faculty Has Seven Departments:
 Department of English language and literature
 Department of Chemistry
 Department of Mathematics
 Department of Physics
 Department of Biology
 Department of Pashto language and literature
 Department of Islamic Studies

ٍAgriculture Faculty
The Agriculture faculty was the Second Faculty  in Paktika University. The faculty offers a four-year Education program. The Faculty has around 500 students and  enrolls around 200 students each year.

The Faculty Has Two Departments:
 Department of Horticulture
 Department of Animal science

See also 
List of universities in Afghanistan

References

External links
 Ministry of Education in Afghanistan
 http://www.bakhtarnews.com.af/pashtu/education/item/43084

Educational institutions established in 2012
Universities in Afghanistan
2012 establishments in Afghanistan